Dani Montalvo is an American actress. She is most noted for her performance as Lorena Bobbitt in the television film I Was Lorena Bobbitt, for which she was a Canadian Screen Award nominee for Best Actress in a Television Film or Miniseries at the 10th Canadian Screen Awards in 2022.

Filmography

Film

Television

References

External links

Living people
21st-century American actresses
American film actresses
American television actresses
Year of birth missing (living people)